Fissuroma maculans is a fungus species of the genus of Fissuroma.

References

Fungi described in 2011